This is a list of countries with annual rates and counts for killings by law enforcement officers.

List

Historical data

2020s

2010s

2000s

1990s

Chart

See also
Lists of killings by law enforcement officers
Police brutality
Police firearm use by country
Police use of deadly force in the United States

References

Lists of countries
Lists of countries by population-related issue
Law enforcement
Law enforcement
Race and crime
Crime-related lists